Licciardi is an Italian surname. Notable people with the surname include:

 Maria Licciardi (born 1951), Italian gangster of the Licciardi clan
 Vincenzo Licciardi (born 1965), Italian gangster
 Vinny Licciardi, viral protagonist

Italian-language surnames